Mad Max: Fury Road is a limited comic book series created by George Miller, Nico Lathouris and Mark Sexton. Serving as a prequel to the 2015 film of the same name, in addition to bridging the events of the film with Mad Max Beyond Thunderdome, the series focuses on several characters from the film at various points in their lives before it.

The series consists of four issues. Beginning in May 2015, Vertigo published one issue per month, ending in August. A single-volume collection of all of the issues was published on 26 August. The reception of the series was mixed—some considered it unnecessary and poorly executed, and many harshly criticized the issue centred on Imperator Furiosa. However, the issue focused on Nux and Immortan Joe, and the two issues focused on Max Rockatansky were received more positively.

Plot 

All of the prequel comics begin with an introduction by the “Wordburger”, an oral storyteller and historian. In each comic, the Wordburger is seen narrating the story of the respective protagonist to the residents of the Citadel, after it has been liberated from Immortan Joe's rule.

Nux and Immortan Joe 

The first comic centres on the origins of Nux and Immortan Joe.

The first part of the comic focuses on the origins of Nux. Nux's parents travel to the Citadel where they live on the ground without basic necessities. To support his family, Nux's father takes up a job at the top of the Citadel but eventually dies due to the hazardous conditions. Nux's sick mother soon dies as well and believing his father to be still alive, he tries to reach the top by grabbing onto an elevator used by the guards. Nux desperately tries to hold on and the guards watching him start laughing. As he laughs back in a mocking response, the guards are stunned by his grit and one of them saves him from slipping by pulling him up to the platform. They call him "a hard nut to crack", which leads to him being named "Nux", and he eventually joins the War Boys when he grows up.

The second part focuses on the origins of Joe. After society started collapsing, war veteran Colonel Joe Moore formed a raider gang along with others who had served under him like Major Kalashnikov. During one of his raids, a fat man who is about to be executed reveals the location of a massive fortified aquifer in exchange for being spared. However, he warns that it is nearly impossible to enter without being granted access by those inside. Joe then tries to convince the defenders of the aquifer to allow him access by offering them several sex slaves. However, they refuse and he launches an assault. The resulting siege lasts many days, killing many of his followers and depleting their resources. He sends his scouts to search for more supplies, but they fail to find any; however, they report the discoveries of an abandoned oil refinery to the north, and a lead mine to the west.

Joe then draws up a plan to climb to the top of the aquifer by sending up a monitor lizard with his men tied to it by the rope. The lizard however keeps coming back down every time until one of his henchmen cuts off his own finger and attaches it to a rope, using it as a treat to motivate it to scale all the way to the top. The plan initially backfires, as most of them are killed. As the inhabitants of the aquifer begin executing the survivors and hanging their corpses from the walls, many of Joe's followers on the ground lose hope and prepare to leave. Joe however emerges with his few remaining followers, having killed all of the defenders. His stunned followers start calling him "Immortal", and he eventually acquires the name of "Immortan Joe".

The aquifer comes to be known as the Citadel and becomes the base for Joe's army. His men start operating the previously-discovered oil refinery and lead mine for supplies. The refinery is named as "Gas Town" and given to the fat man who told him of the aquifer and comes to be called the "People Eater". The mine is named "The Bullet Farm" and is given to Kalashnikov, who comes to be known as the "Bullet Farmer". Over time, Joe has three sons; Scabrous Scrotus, Rictus Erectus, and Corpus Colossus, all of whom were either mentally handicapped or deformed, paving the way for his plan to father healthy sons as heirs by using various women as his wives who would be isolated from the harsh elements of the wasteland, thus increasing the chances of them being born healthy.

Furiosa 
The second comic takes place right before the events of the film. Joe selected the Five Wives, healthy young women who could provide him with a suitable male heir. He kept them locked in a vault, providing them with food, water and a teacher, the Wordburger "Miss Giddy". After conducting an examination on Angharad, Joe's physician, the Organic Mechanic, informs him that he has a window of two days to impregnate her if he wants a healthy son. Joe assigns a warrior, Imperator Furiosa, to protect the Wives who are at first constantly hostile to her.

The Wives are abused by Joe regularly with Angharad being the first. She is impregnated by him and later tries to kill the foetus, but is stopped by Furiosa after she hears her scream. The other Wives also arrive there and yell at Furiosa to leave them alone. Furiosa in anger hits them and chastises them for being ungrateful for the privileges they get. They however state that their lives are miserable, and Angharad mocks Furiosa stating all she knows is killing. Furiosa replies that Angharad was doing the same. Gradually however a bond forms between the Wives and Furiosa.

One night while hearing the musical performance of the Wives, Joe expresses interest in taking Fragile's virginity. The Dag upon hearing this tells him to stay away since she is the only one who has not been abused by him, and Joe in anger rapes and impregnates her. He later demands that they be more appreciative to him and limits their freedoms, while making them wear chastity belts. Furiosa is removed from her position as their bodyguard, but hatches a plan along with them to help them escape. Giddy however tells them to leave without her as she is too old, and they are able to successfully escape the Citadel.

Mad Max

Part 1 
The third comic takes place between the events of Mad Max Beyond Thunderdome and Mad Max: Fury Road. Max Rockatansky travels to Gas Town to battle in the gladiator arena called "Thunderdome Plus", in order to win a V8 engine so he can build a new V8 Interceptor. During the battle, most of the combatants are killed and Max gets grabbed by one of the final three combatants who is killed by a Buzzard, a bandit wearing a body armor with sharp blades. The Buzzard tries to kill Max, who dodges him and is given a flare by a woman. He uses it to burn out the Buzzard's eye and kills him with his own helmet.

The other Buzzards accuse Max of cheating, but the organisers refuse to recognise this and they warn him that he will pay. As he takes the engine to the Interceptor, the Buzzards follow and knock him unconscious. When he wakes up, he is stabbed in the femoral artery. Before leaving with the Interceptor, the Buzzard who stabbed him offers him a choice out of respect: Pull the knife out and bleed to death, or let it remain there and burn under the desert sun. Max later frees one of his hands, but finds that all of his limbs are too damaged to be able to escape. He then pulls out the knife with his free hand and cuts the rope, but starts bleeding heavily. The woman who helped him at the Thunderdome however saves him and tells him that he owes her.

Part 2 

The woman who saved Max escorts him to a sunken city where the Buzzards live underground and asks him to rescue her daughter Glory from them. Max refuses when she offers to tag along and goes alone. The Buzzards had been using Glory to retrieve supplies from small places, however she escaped and hid where they could not find her. Max encounters her and she screams, thinking of him as hostile. This alerts the Buzzards who chase after them. Max quickly gains her trust by revealing that he was sent by her mother and she guides him to her hiding place through a room where the Buzzards breed moth for food. Finding it too dark, he lights a flare and the two quickly get ambushed by Buzzards, however he manages to kill all of them.

Glory leads Max out through a hole in the ceiling, but he refuses to leave without the Interceptor despite being warned by her of it being heavily guarded. Driving away, he engages in a battle with the spiked vehicles of the Buzzards and manages to escape. He takes Glory back to her mother who invites him to come with them, but he declines. As he drives off, he soon sees the Buzzard who had stabbed him fatally hitting the two with his truck. Max then rams his Interceptor into his truck in anger and kills him, but both Glory and her mother soon die of their injuries. Distraught, he buries them and leaves the city.

After the Wordburger ends his story, the people listening overhear Corpus Colossus warn a woman that they cannot keep giving away water to everybody who comes to the Citadel as it will be seen as a sign of weakness, and tells her to take control. The Wordburger then warns his listeners that they are about to repeat the mistakes of the past, but they can make the future better if they learn and improve themselves.

Release 
The comic book series was revealed in February 2015 by Vertigo and Miller was announced to helm the writing team. Beginning 20 May 2015, Vertigo started releasing four comic book prequels, one per month, that detail the backstory for a character in the film. The first comic titled Mad Max: Fury Road – Nux and Immortan Joe #1 was released on 20 May. The second one titled Mad Max: Fury Road – Furiosa #1 was released on 17 June. The third one titled Mad Max: Fury Road – Mad Max #1 was released on 8 July. The final prequel comic titled Mad Max: Fury Road – Mad Max #2 was released on 5 August. A single-volume paperback of the series was released on 26 August, collecting the four issues alongside a bonus short story chronicling the creation of the War Rig.

Reception 

The series has received mixed reviews. The issue centered on Imperator Furiosa has been harshly criticized for its depictions of rape and its characterization of female characters. Some critics opined that it negatively affects the film. However, the issue centering on Nux and Immortan Joe and the two issues centering on Max were received more positively. The issue was in the top twenty of the "Apple iBooks US Bestseller List - Comics & Graphic Novels" for three weeks.

Individual monthly sales were as follows:
 Nux & Immortan Joe #1 (May 2015) – 11,569 issues sold, #141 top-selling issue by dollar volume, #162 top-selling issue by number of copies sold
 Furiosa #1 (June 2015) – 20,733 sold, #86 by dollar volume, #115 by number of copies
 Max #1 (July 2015) – 79,955 sold, #9 by dollar volume, #12 by number of copies
 Max #2 (August 2015) – 23,172 sold, #68 by dollar volume, #103 by number of copies
 Collected edition trade paperback (September 2015): 5,387 copies sold, #10 graphic novel by dollar volume, #7 graphic novel by units sold (An additional 536 copies were sold in October 2015)

References 

Mad Max
2015 comics debuts
Comics based on films
Prequel comics
Comics set in Australia